So Far Away is The Chords debut album. It reached a peak of number 30 on the U.K. albums chart in a three-week chart run. The cover was inspired by the second LP by The Spencer Davis Group.

Track listing
All songs written & composed by Chris Pope except as noted.
Side One
"Maybe Tomorrow"
"Happy Families"
"Breaks My Heart"
"Tumbling Down"
"Hold On, I'm Coming" (Hayes/Porter)
"I'm Not Sure"

Side Two
"Something's Missing"
"It's No Use"
"What Are We Gonna Do Now" (Billy Hassett)
"She Said, She Said" (Lennon–McCartney)
"Dreamdolls" (Chris Pope/Billy Hassett)
"So Far Away"

References

1980 debut albums
Polydor Records albums